Lavagna is a comune (municipality) in the Metropolitan City of Genoa, Italy.

History and Culture 

The village, unlike nearby Chiavari which has pre-Roman evidence, seems to have developed in Roman times with the Latin name of Lavania. The name has remained unchanged over the centuries until it became the current toponym of Lavagna in the following centuries.

Since 1198 it was a fief of the Fieschi family, who used Lavagna as their stronghold in the numerous inner struggles of the Republic of Genoa.

In 1564 it was sacked by the admiral of the Ottoman fleet Occhiali. From 1815 it was part of the Kingdom of Sardinia, and, later, of the Kingdom of Italy.

The city recreates medieval festivities annually as the "Torta dei Fieschi" (Fieschi Cake Party), since 1949, the festivities is about a colorful parade through the Lavagna streets that reunites the inhabitants of the six medieval quarters of Lavagna, as the gigantic cake is distributed among those in the crowd who have found the matching half of their tickets.

The main city sights of Lavagna are: "Church of Santo Stefano (17th century style), Church of Santa Giulia (1654), Church of Nostra Signora del Ponte (13th century), with the nearby bridge.

According to the tradition, the Italian poet Dante Alighieri crossed the bridge during his travel to France.

Controversies 
In 2016, Giuseppe Sanguineti, the former mayor of Lavagna, was arrested due to the involvement of Ndrangheta, the Calabrian mafia, in the disposal of the municipal waste.

Notable people 
 Fieschi Family
 Fanny Cadeo, (1970) actress and showgirl

References

External links 
"Official WebSite"
"Fieschi Cake Annual Party"

Cities and towns in Liguria
Coastal towns in Liguria